Intestinal neuronal dysplasia (IND) is an inherited disease of the intestine that affects one in 3000 children and adults. The intestine uses peristalsis to push its contents toward the anus; people with IND have a problem with the motor neurons that lead to the intestine, inhibiting this process and thus preventing digestion.

It can often be confused for Hirschsprung's disease, as both have similar symptoms.

Presentation
IND can be grouped into NID A and NID B, with the "A" form affecting the sympathetic innervation, and the "B" version affecting the parasympathetic innervation.
In 2002 Martucciello and colleagues published the first analysis of associated anomalies in IND population is an important clinical approach to investigate possible pathogenetic correlations. Two recessive syndromes were identified (3 families). The first was characterized by NID B, intestinal malrotation, and congenital short bowel, the second by NID B, short stature, mental retardation, and facial dysmorphism. In this study, gastrointestinal anomalies accounted for 67.4% of all associated disorders. These data suggest a strong correlation between IND and intestinal development.

Diagnosis

Treatment
Conservative treatment involves the long term use of laxatives and enemas, and has limited success. Dietary changes in order to control the disease are ineffective and high fiber diets often worsen the symptoms in children. As a last resort, surgical treatment (internal sphincter myectomy or colon resection) is used.  In extreme cases, the only effective cure is a complete transplant of the affected parts.

Society
A famous case of IND is that of Adele Chapman, who had a triple transplant of the small intestine, pancreas and liver, the first of its kind in the UK; therefore the official charity of IND is the Adele Chapman Foundation.

References

External links 

Gastrointestinal tract disorders